In geometry, the great hexacronic icositetrahedron is the dual of the great cubicuboctahedron. Its faces are kites. Part of each kite lies inside the solid, hence is invisible in solid models.

Proportions
The dihedral angle equals .

References

External links
 

Dual uniform polyhedra